Jerzego is a spider genus of the jumping spider family, Salticidae, with three described species native to Asia.

Etymology
The genus is named after the Polish arachnologist Jerzy Prószyński.

Species
 Jerzego alboguttatus (Simon, 1903) – Malaysia, Sumatra
 Jerzego bipartitus (Simon, 1903) – Sri Lanka, India
 Jerzego corticicola Maddison, 2014 – Malaysia

References

Salticidae
Spiders of Asia
Salticidae genera